The Interstate Highways in Tennessee are those parts of the Dwight D. Eisenhower National System of Interstate and Defense Highways owned and maintained by the Tennessee Department of Transportation (TDOT) the US state of Tennessee. Currently the state has  of Interstate Highways. Tennessee's Interstate Highways are designated as the "Senator Albert Gore Sr. Memorial Interstate System" after a U.S. Senator from Tennessee who sponsored the Federal Aid Highway Act of 1956 that created the Interstate Highway System.


Description
Tennessee's interstate system is designated as the "Senator Albert Gore Sr. Memorial Interstate System." Albert Gore Sr. was a three-term United States Senator from Tennessee who co-sponsored the Federal Aid Highway Act of 1956, also known as the Interstate Highway Act. 

The segment of I-40 in Tennessee is also the longest segment of all of the states the route traverses.

History
I-24 was originally planned to run between Nashville and Chattanooga; it was approved to be extended to I-57 in southern Illinois in August 1964.

The first section of interstate highway in Tennessee was a short freeway in Knoxville, completed in two segments in 1952 and 1955, that was integrated into the interstate highway system, becoming part of I-40 and I-75. The first initial segment of Interstate highway in Tennessee was a short portion of I-65 near the Alabama state line that opened on November 15, 1958.

The first section of interstate to be complete between two major cities in Tennessee was I-40 between Memphis and Nashville, the last segment between these cities of which was dedicated on July 24, 1966. Most of I-40 between Nashville and Knoxville was also complete by this time. On December 20, 1974, the final segments of I-40, I-75, and I-81 in Tennessee opened to traffic, opening the final segments of mainline interstate highway initially allocated to Tennessee in 1956. At this time, however, work was not fully complete on these sections of I-81 and I-40; this occurred on August 27, 1975 and September 12, 1975, respectively. The last segment of I-24 in Tennessee, located west of Nashville, opened on January 7, 1978. The last segment of interstate highway in Tennessee to be completed that was planned by the Interstate Highway Act was on I-440 in Nashville, which opened on April 3, 1987.

Due to citizen opposition, a short segment of I-40 in Memphis planned to pass through the city's Overton Park was never built. Opposition began after the routing was proposed in the 1950s, and citizens waged a multi-year legal battle that culminated in the U.S. Supreme Court case Citizens to Preserve Overton Park v. Volpe in 1971. After this case, TDOT continued to explore options to construct this section until 1981, when it was abandoned, and a nearby section of I-240 was redesignated as part of I-40.

Since the completion of Tennessee's original interstate system, additional segments of highway in the state have been added to the system. An extension of I-26 into Tennessee was approved by AASHTO in 1988, and the last section of this route was completed in August 2003. I-140 is a designation that was applied to a section of the Pellissippi Parkway in Knox and Blount counties that was constructed in the 1990s. I-840 was first proposed by the state legislature in 1986 and constructed between 1991 and 2012; it officially became an interstate highway on August 12, 2016. A segment of SR 385 in the Memphis area became I-269 in 2018. 

An extension of I-69 into Tennessee was proposed in the 1990s. In 2005, I-3 was also proposed into Tennessee as a Third Infantry Division Highway.

Primary Interstates

Auxiliary Interstates

See also

References

External links

 
Interstate